Hungarian metal is the heavy metal music scene of Hungary.  One of the most popular and well-known band is Attila Csihar's Tormentor.  Other bands include Sear Bliss, Thy Catafalque, Ektomorf, FreshFabrik, Blind Myself, The Idoru and Subscribe.

History

1980s
Tormentor, formed in 1985, recorded their first album entitled "Anno Domini" in 1988, which was not released until the end of communism. The album reached Norway through the tape-trading community. Following the suicide of Per Ohlin, Mayhem invited Attila Csihar from Tormentor to join the band; he was to perform the vocals on "De Mysteriis Dom Sathanas". Tormentor split up in 1991 but later reformed, releasing their only studio album so far Recipe Ferrum! 777. The band were on hold for a long time before reuniting in 2018, releasing a number of live albums.

1990s

In 1993 the band FreshFabrik was founded by András Szabó and Levente Kovács. In 1997 the band was signed by Warner Music Group to release its second full-length studio album, "Nerve".

In 1993 one of the most successful Hungarian metal bands, Ektomorf, was formed. The Zoltán Farkas-led band from Mezőkovácsháza managed to get signed by PIAS Recordings and later by major label Nuclear Blast. Initially their albums, such as "Kalyi Jag" and "I Scream Up to the Sky", were heavily influenced by Sepultura; however, they later pioneered a unique sound combining thrash metal with Hungarian folk music.

In 1994 the band Blind Myself was formed, which became one of the first metalcore bands. Later they became one of the leading metal bands in Hungary.

In 1998 a band from Sopron named Dalriada conquered Hungary with their folk metal. Their album entitled "Kikelet" helped the band perform in major European music festivals.

2000s
The 2000s saw the emergence of bands which combined metal music with other genres such as post-hardcore, nu metal.

In 2003 a supergroup was formed named The Idoru by ex-members of Newborn, Blind Myself, and Dawncore. They managed to release several records including their second full-length studio album Monologue which brought them success outside Hungary. They toured with the American Misfits in Europe in 2007 and with Ignite in Japan in 2008.

2010s
In 2012 the band Shell Beach released their second full-length Dávid Schram-produced studio album entitled This Is Desolation which helped them sign a contract with Redfield Digital Records.

Notable Hungarian metal bands and artists

See also
Hungarian rock

References

Music scenes
Hungarian music